Prosh at the University of Adelaide is organised by the Adelaide University Union. Prosh began in 1905, students used the occasion to poke fun at established South Australian institutions such as the horse-drawn trams. Prosh began as a procession through the City of Adelaide. In recent years the prosh parade has involved live bands on the back of flatbed trucks, floats created by student clubs and various inebriated groups of students being transported by booze cruisers. A prosh newspaper is published for the week. Prosh week has developed into a time to raise funds for charities. Many 'stunts' are registered with the organisors and are held in prosh week. The stunts are nominally undertaken to acquire funds for the official Prosh charitable cause. Prosh week winds up with the Prosh After Dark social event in the Uni Bar, originally a Prosh Ball was held during the week.

Prosh newspaper
Starting in 1954 a satirical newspaper has been published by the students of the University of Adelaide for Prosh Week. The newspaper was commonly referred to as the Prosh rag. Since 1993 the newspaper has been produced as an issue of the student newspaper, On Dit. The Prosh newspaper usually contains humorous references to various well known persons of the day.

Famous participants
Over the years many students who were to become well known members of the South Australian community have taken part
1948 - Robin Millhouse, the St Marks irregulars.

Infamous pranks
1966 - Radio Prosh broadcast from a pirate radio station located aboard a boat in international waters off the coast of South Australia. Broadcast personality Ernie Sigley was kidnapped and brought to the specially converted fishing boat.
1973 - Engineering students suspended an FJ Holden from the University Footbridge.
Under cover of the early hours of one Friday morning, a group of volunteers pushed the FJ Holden under the bridge next to the water on the Southern bank of the Torrens. The car was lifted using beams and lifting gear attached to a small hand operated crane located on the footbridge. The crane, with car attached was then pushed out to the centre of the bridge. The car was then firmly secured to the bridge using a large chain. The crane and volunteers then quickly disappeared into the night and were never found.
This prank has become part of university folk lore. When one of the students, Ronald Sainsbury, returned to the University with his daughter 43 years later in 2016 he was besieged by current students who had heard rumours of the prank but not believed it to be true. He ended up spending an hour with them drawing diagrams and explaining the mechanics of it.

Circa 1990s - Kidnapping of Adelaide identities and their ransom for donations to charitable causes. Hostages were held on the Sail Training Ship the Falie.
2005 - Peter Goers, a presenter for ABC Radio, was kidnapped from his office by two students dressed as an elephant and a pig, and held hostage until the ABC donated an undisclosed sum to Oxfam's Save the Children fund.

See also
Prosh (University of Western Australia)
Melbourne University Prosh Week
Rag (student society)

References

Non-profit organisations based in South Australia
1905 establishments in Australia
University of Adelaide
Student organisations in Australia